Sağırsu is a village in the Siirt District of Siirt Province in Turkey. The village is populated by Kurds of the Botikan tribe and had a population of 256 in 2021.

References 

Villages in Siirt District
Kurdish settlements in Siirt Province